The Philippines competed at the 1936 Summer Olympics in Berlin, Germany. 31 competitors, all men, took part in 20 events in 6 sports.

Medalists

Athletics

Men
Track & road events

Field events

Basketball

The Philippines finished with a win–loss record of 4–1 and placed 5th overall.

Team roster

|}
| style="vertical-align:top;" |
 Head coach
Dionisio Calvo
|}

Boxing

Shooting

Two shooters represented the Philippines in 1936.
Men

Swimming

Swimming
Men

Wrestling

Men's Freestyle
 Enrique Jurado

References

External links
 Philippine Sports Commission
 Official Olympic Reports
 International Olympic Committee results database

Nations at the 1936 Summer Olympics
1936
Summer Olympics